Cuicatec may refer to:
 Cuicatecs, an ethnic group of Oaxaca, Mexico
 Cuicatec language, the Oto-Manguean language spoken by them

See also 
 Cuitlatec people, a historic ethnic group of Guerrero, Mexico
 Cuitlatec language, the extinct language isolate formerly spoken by them